Chungsuk of Goryeo (30 July 1294 – 3 May 1339), born Wang Do, later changed his name to Wang Man, was the 27th king of the Goryeo (Korea), from 1313 to 1330 and again from 1332 to 1339. He was sometimes known by his Mongolian name, Aratnashiri, which was rendered in hanja as Aralteunolksilri.

Biography
In 1314 King Chungseon passed the throne to his son King Chungsuk. In 1321 King Chungsuk fathered his son King Chunghye. This prompted the previous crown prince of Goryeo, Öljeyitü, to establish an alliance with Emperor Sidibala, and King Chungsuk was thus interned in 1321. However, Sidibala was assassinated in 1323 and Öljeitü's plan was aborted.

King Chungsuk, who was allowed to return to Goryeo in 1325, passed the throne to King Chunghye in 1330 but was reinstated after two years because King Chunghye was deposed by Yuan.

King Chungsuk died in 1339.

Family
Father: Chungseon of Goryeo (고려 충선)
Grandfather: Chungnyeol of Goryeo (고려 충렬)
Grandmother: Queen Jangmok of the Yuan Borjigin clan (장목왕후 보르지긴씨)
Mother: Consort Ui (의비)
Consorts and their Respective issue(s):
Grand Princess Bokguk of the Yuan Borjigin clan (복국장공주 보르지긴씨; d. 1319) – No issue.
Grand Princess Joguk of the Yuan Borjigin clan (조국장공주 보르지긴씨; 1308–1325)
Heir Successor Yongsan (용산원자)
Bayankhutag, Princess Gyeonghwa (백안홀도 경화공주; d. 1344) – No issue.
Queen Gongwon of the Namyang Hong clan (공원왕후 홍씨; 1298–1380)
Crown Prince Wang Jeong (태자 왕정)
Prince Wang Gi (왕기)
Royal Consort Su of the Andong Gwon clan (수비 권씨; d. 1340) – No issue.

In popular culture
Portrayed by Lee Jung-gil in the 2005 MBC Mini series Jikji.
Portrayed by Kwon Tae-won in the 2013–2014 MBC TV series Empress Ki.

See also
List of Goryeo people
List of Koreans
History of Korea
Korea under Yuan rule

References

 
 Kang Jae-eun - Land of Scholars: Two Thousand Years of Korean Confucianism

1294 births
1339 deaths
14th-century Korean monarchs
Year of birth unknown
Korean Buddhist monarchs
Korean people of Mongolian descent